Neolanguage may refer to:

Neolinguagem, a Portuguese term for gender-neutral neologisms in Portuguese
Constructed language, languages developed by design, as opposed to occurring naturally
Jargon, specialized terminology for a particular field
Neologism, recently-coined or otherwise isolated terms
Neo language, an international auxiliary language
Newspeak, fictional language of the novel Nineteen Eighty-Four

See also 

 Neurolinguistics